Pavel Petrovich Bulakhov (1824–1875) was a Russian composer, and brother of Pyotr Bulakhov.

References

1824 births
1875 deaths
19th-century composers